Buq'ata is a Druze town, administered as a local council, in the northern section of the Israeli-occupied portion of the Golan Heights. Buq'ata covers an area of 7,000 dunams (7 km²) between  two mountains in the Golan Heights, Mount Hermonit and Mount Varda.

Granted the right to obtain Israeli citizenship following the passage of the Golan Heights Law, as of 2012 most of the residents, like the majority of Druze in the Golan Heights, adopted permanent residency but refused Israeli citizenship and instead retain Syrian citizenship.

Buq'ata is one of the four remaining Syrian-Druze communities on the Israeli-occupied portion of the Golan Heights, the others being Majdal Shams, Ein Qiniyye and Mas'ade. Geologically and geographically a distinction is made between the Golan Heights and Mount Hermon, the boundary being marked by the Sa'ar Stream; however, administratively they are usually grouped together. Buq'ata and Mas'ade are on the Golan side of the boundary, characterised by black volcanic rock (basalt), while Majdal Shams and Ein Qiniyye are on the Hermon side, thus sitting on limestone.

History 
Buq'ata was founded in the 1880s by families from the neighboring town of Majdal Shams. It was destroyed in 1888 during a series of feuds between rival villages in the area, and again in 1925, during the Great Syrian Revolt against the French mandatory rule. It became part of independent Syria in 1946.
 
In the course of the Six-Day War in 1967, the town was captured by Israel.
 
Buq'ata achieved Israeli local council status in 1982. Since the uprising in Syria, some of the violence has spilled over into Buq'ata, where residents loyal to the government of President Bashar al-Assad in Damascus have clashed with anti-Assad activists.

Demography
According to data compiled by Israel's Central Bureau of Statistics in 2001, Buq'ata ranked 2 out of 10 on the national socioeconomic index. In 2000, 72.5% of Grade 12 students graduated with a Bagrut matriculation certificate. In 2021, 98.9% of students matriculated, 2nd best in the country, though only 1.1% did so at the maximum level of Mathematics and English studies, 9th worst in the country.

The inhabitants of Buq'ata have permanent residency in Israel and receive social welfare benefits from Israel.

Economy
The local economy is predominantly agricultural, with apples and grapes being the main crops. In 2013, Buq'ata harvested 55,000 tons of apples, which it sold to markets in Israel or Syria. This arrangement still worked in 2013, but is under threat due to the civil war in Syria.

See also
 Status and position of Golan Heights Druze

References 

Towns in Quneitra Governorate
Populated places established in the 1880s
Local councils in Northern District (Israel)
Druze communities in Syria
1880s establishments in Ottoman Syria